Nakashipara Assembly constituency is an assembly constituency in Nadia district in the Indian state of West Bengal.

Overview
As per orders of the Delimitation Commission, No. 81 Nakashipara Assembly constituency  is composed of the following: Bethuadahari I  and Bethuadahari II, Billwa Gram, Birpur I, Birpur II, Dharmada, Dogachhia, Majher Gram, Muragachha, Nakasipara and Patikabari gram panchayats of Nakashipara community development block, and Palit Begia and Rajarampur Ghoraikhetra gram panchayats of Kaliganj community development block.

Nakashipara Assembly constituency is part of No. 12 Krishnanagar (Lok Sabha constituency).

Members of Legislative Assembly

Election results

2021

2016
In the 2016 election, KALLOL KHAN of Trinamool Congress defeated his nearest rival TANMOY GANGULY of CPI(M)and elected as M.L.A for the fourth time.

Anil Barai, contesting as an independent candidate, was a rebel Congress candidate.

.# Swing calculated on Congress+Trinamool Congress vote percentages taken together in 2006.

1977-2016

In the year 2016  Kallol Khan of Trinamool Congress won the Nakashipara seat defeating his nearest rivals Tanmoy Ganguly of CPI(M) .
In the 2006 and 2001 state assembly elections, Kallol Khan of Trinamool Congress won the Nakashipara seat defeating his nearest rivals S.M. Sadi of CPI(M) in 2006 and Shaikh Khabiruddin Ahmed of CPI(M) in 2001. Contests in most years were multi cornered but only winners and runners are being mentioned. Shaikh Khabiruddin Ahmed of CPI(M) defeated Dhrubajyoti Ghosh of  Congress in 1996, and Kallol Khan representing Congress in 1991. Santosh Kumar Sinha of CPI(M) defeated Kallol Khan of Congress in 1987. Mir Fakir Mohammad of CPI(M) defeated  Nil Kamal Sarkar of Congress in 1982 and S.M.Badaruddin of Congress in 1977.

1951–1972
Between 1967 and 1972 the Nakashipara seat was reserved for scheduled castes. Nil Kamal Sarkar of Congress won in 1972. Govindo Chandra Mondal, Independent, won in 1971. Nil Kamal Sarkar of Congress won in 1969. M.C.Mondal of Bangla Congress won in 1967. In 1962 S.M.Fazlur Rahman of Congress won the Nakasipara open seat. In 1957 Nakashipara was a joint seat with one seat reserved for SC. Mahananda Haldar and S.M.Fazlur Rahman, both of Congress, won from Nakashipara. In independent India's first election in 1951, Jagannath Majumdar of Congress won the Nakshipara open seat.

References

Assembly constituencies of West Bengal
Politics of Nadia district